Propoxycaine (INN) is a local anesthetic.

Local anesthetics
4-Aminobenzoate esters
Phenol ethers
Diethylamino compounds